The Grand Garden EP is a 2008 EP recorded by singer-songwriter Aslyn and was released on Independent. The EP contains 28 songs, most of which were recorded between Aslyn's debut album, Lemon Love and her second album, The Dandelion Sessions. It is divided up into four parts or 'phases', each one having seven different songs.

Track listing
Disc 1
"Wally"
"What is the Difference"
"A Lucky One"
"Bread Crumbs"
"Love Engineer"
Promise
"Bettertown" (Jeremy Mitchell, Aslyn)
Disc 2
"Suburbia" (Jeremy Mitchell, Aslyn)
"Golden"
"Mr. Willow"
"Whenever You Go"
"Turn Around"
"Kisses"
"One Extra Hour"
Disc 3
"The Flies Know"
"Here's To Believe"
"In and Out"
"Puzzle"
"Not the Only One"
"Can I Go" (Jon Mitchell, Aslyn)
Disc 4
"Rosemary"
"That's When I Love You"
"Wish You Were Here" (Jeremy Mitchell, Aslyn)
"If All of These Things"
"Cannot Take a Secret"
"In These Shoes (parking lot part 1)"
"You Don't See"

2008 EPs
Aslyn albums
Album series